The Japanese Federation of Pulp and Paper Workers' Unions (JPW, Kamipa Rengo) is a trade union representing workers in the paper manufacturing industry in Japan.

The union was founded in 1988, with the merger of the National Federation of Paper and Pulp Industry Workers' Unions, the National Council of Paper and Pulp Workers' Unions, the General Federation of Paper and Pulp Processing Workers' Unions, and the Paper and Pulp Industry Workers Unions Consultative Council.  It affiliated to the recently-founded Japanese Trade Union Confederation, and by 1996 had 52,957 members.  By 2020, its membership had fallen to 25,453.

References

External links

Paper industry trade unions
Trade unions established in 1988
Trade unions in Japan
1988 establishments in Japan